Amotape District is one of seven districts of the province Paita in Peru.

References